Bovedy is a meteorite that fell in the area of Bovedy, Northern Ireland, on April 25 1969.  After entering the atmosphere over the Bristol Channel, it traversed Wales and the Irish Sea before landing near Limavady.

The meteorite had broken into two pieces. One piece smashed through the asbestos roof of a shop in Sprucefield, breaking into two further pieces.

Composition and classification
The meteorite appeared to be brown and black, but the inside showed grey chondrules with flecks of metal within the meteorite. Before it separated on impact, the first fragment weighed 513g and the second fragment weighed 4,950g.

Bovedy is an ordinary chondrite from the L group that is petrologic type 3.

References

External links
Astronotes publication Armagh Planetarium
Meteoritical Society Bulletin Database

See also
 Glossary of meteoritics
 Meteorite
 Ordinary chondrite

Meteorites found in the United Kingdom
1969 in Northern Ireland